2010 J.League Cup Final was the 18th final of the J.League Cup competition. The final was played at National Stadium in Tokyo on November 3, 2010. Júbilo Iwata won the championship.

Match details

See also
2010 J.League Cup

References

J.League Cup
2010 in Japanese football
Júbilo Iwata matches
Sanfrecce Hiroshima matches